In Love With the End is the third studio album by the hardcore/metalcore band Born from Pain.

Track listing 
 "Rise or Die" – 3:23
 "Judgement" – 3:02
 "The New Hate" – 3:25
 "Kill It Tonight" – 3:35
 "Renewal" – 2:22 (feat. Jacob Bredahl, ex Hatesphere, Barcode)
 "Fear This World" – 2:52
 "Raging Heart" – 3:30
 "Dead Code" – 4:53
 "Suicide Nations" – 3:11
 "Hour of the Wolf" – 4:10

Personnel 
Ché Snelting – vocals
Stefan van Neerven – guitar
Karl Fieldhouse – guitar
Rob Franssen – bass guitar
Roel Klomp – drums

2005 albums
Born from Pain albums
Metal Blade Records albums